Bivinculata is a genus of moths of the Bombycidae family. It contains the single species Bivinculata kalikotei, which is found in Nepal.

References

Bombycidae